Brig of Dread or Bridge of Dread is a bridge to Purgatory that a dead soul had to cross. Evil souls fall from the bridge into hell. This is a common afterlife theme found in some form or other in many cultures, such as the Chinvat Bridge of Zoroastrianism and As-Sirāt of Islam.

The "Brig o' Dread" is an important element in The Lyke-Wake Dirge, an old Northern English waking song.

There is much in that song that seems Germanic heathen. The "Brig o' Dread" is probably related to Bifröst (which probably means "trembling-way") or Gjallarbrú ("resounding-bridge" or "noisy-bridge") which may be the symbolism here rather than the Christian later folk-etymological explanation.

References

Afterlife places
Northumbrian folklore